Paver base is a form of aggregate used in the construction of patios and walkways whose topmost layer consists of mortarless (or "dry-laid") pavers. The first layer in the construction of such a surface is called the subgrade—this is the layer of native material underneath the intended surface. It is usually compacted and stabilized. If the final pavement is to have vehicle traffic, a layer of subbase of crushed stone or concrete must come next—this layer will even out the subgrade and will bear the heaviest load from the pavement above. Next comes the base course (also called the aggregate base course or ABC) composed of crushed gravel varying from  down to dust-particle size. It too is typically compacted and evened. The pavers are then laid on top of this, and then a uniform, fine-grained sand is poured between them.

References

Building materials